Poynton with Worth is a civil parish in Cheshire East, England.  It contains 19 buildings that are recorded in the National Heritage List for England as designated listed buildings, all of which are at Grade II.  This grade is the lowest of the three gradings given to listed buildings and is applied to "buildings of national importance and special interest".  The parish contains the town of Poynton and surrounding countryside.  The listed buildings include houses, farmhouses, two milestones, a guide post, a former generator house, a bridge over the Macclesfield Canal, an ice house, and a boundary stone.

See also

Listed buildings in Hazel Grove and Bramhall
Listed buildings in Marple, Greater Manchester
Listed buildings in Pott Shrigley
Listed buildings in Adlington

References
Citations

Sources

 

Listed buildings in the Borough of Cheshire East
Lists of listed buildings in Cheshire